Konditor (formerly "Konditor & Cook") is a made-to-order cake bakery specialising in personalised celebration cakes in the United Kingdom. "Konditor" is the German word for confectioner or pastry chef. The company was founded in 1993 by Gerhard Jenne as "Konditor & Cook" but changed its name to "Konditor" in 2018. The first shop is located at 22 Cornwall Rd, SE1 8TW on London's South Bank. There are also branches near Chancery Lane and Mansion House, as well as a delivery service.

Owner Gerhard Jenne was born in Freiburg, Germany and was trained as a baker and pastry chef in Munich, he then came to the UK in 1982. He first worked at the Swiss Centre in Leicester Square, London and from 1983 to 1993 in the Hygienic Bakery and food shops of Justin de Blank and business partner Robert Troop in Knightsbridge/Belgravia.

After qualifying, Jenne moved to London and began working for society grocer and baker Justin de Blank, one of the pioneers of the foodie revolution. Here, Jenne made a name for himself creating cakes for the rich and famous, including Tina Turner and the Rolling Stones.

In 1993 Jenne took over the defunct Queen of Hearts cake shop in Waterloo and transformed it to become the flagship store for Konditor.

Before Konditor & Cook, Waterloo was not known for quality retailing or food shops. Jenne put Konditor and Waterloo on the culinary map, and due to the shortage of qualified pastry chefs Jenne ensured that all staff received high quality training and mentoring. Konditor is highly regarded for its original baking and consistent quality, using organic, free-range eggs and natural butter in all their baking.

Konditor is particularly well known for their extensive range of chocolate brownies, their chocolate/vanilla Curly Whirly cake, a velvet marzipan covered Whiskey Bomb and its original Magic Cakes.

References

External links
 Website

Catering and food service companies of the United Kingdom
Food manufacturers based in London